Strošinci is a village in eastern Croatia located southeast of Vrbanja, near the border with Serbia. The population is 492 (census 2011).

Name
The name of the village in Croatian is plural.

Notable natives and residents

Ivan Cvjetković
Radivoje Ognjanović

See also
Vukovar-Syrmia County
Cvelferija

References

Populated places in Vukovar-Syrmia County
Populated places in Syrmia